Lacus Hiemalis (Latin hiemālis, "Lake of Winter") is a small lunar mare in the Terra Nivium region on the Moon. It is located at 15.0° N, 14.0° E and is 50 km in diameter.

References 

Heimalis